Badami railway station (station code: BDM) falls under Hubli railway division of South Western Railway  in Bagalkot district, Karnataka, India. Badami railway station has two platforms which serve mainly Badami Town and nearby heritage tourist places like Badami Caves, Pattadkal and Aihole.

Developments
Reconnaissance engineering -cum- traffic survey for new line between Badami–Yelburga via Gajendragarh (53 km)
This new survey was sanctioned by Railway Board during December 2016 and detailed estimate for conducting reconnaissance engineering -cum- traffic survey was vetted by FA&CAO/CN/BNC on 17.01.2017 and sanctioned by CAO/CN/BNC. Tender to be opened on 30.05.2017

Major trains 
Trains those run through/from Badami are:
 Gol Gumbaz Express
 Hubballi–Secunderabad Express
 Hubballi–Varanasi Weekly Express
 Hubballi–Lokmanya Tilak Terminus Express (via Bijapur)
 Yesvantpur–Barmer AC Express
 Solapur–Hubballi Intercity Express
 Solapur–Gadag DEMU Passenger
 Solapur–Dharwad Passenger
 Bijapur–Hubli Passenger

References 

Hubli railway division
Railway stations in Bagalkot district